Massimo "Bullo" Bulleri (born 10 September 1977) is an Italian former professional basketball player and last covered the role of head coach for Pallacanestro Varese.

Professional playing career
During his pro club career, Bulleri won the European-wide secondary level FIBA Saporta Cup's 1998–99 season championship, and two Italian League championships, in 2002 and 2003. He also won four Italian Cup titles, (2000, 2003, 2004, and 2005), and two Italian Super Cup titles, in 2001 and 2002. He was the voted the Italian League's MVP, in both 2003 and 2005. He was also voted the MVP of the Italian Cup, in 2005.

In 2017, Bulleri retired from playing professional club basketball.

National team playing career
Bulleri was a member of the senior men's Italian national basketball team. With Italy, he played at the 2003 EuroBasket, where he won a bronze medal, at the 2005 EuroBasket, and at the 2007 EuroBasket. He also won the silver medal with the senior Italian national team at the 2004 Athens Summer Olympic Games.

Coaching career
After he retired from playing pro club basketball, Bulleri began working as a basketball coach. In 2017, he became an assistant coach with the Italian League club Varese. On 6 July 2019 Bulleri signed with the Italian 2nd Division club Ravenna Piero Manetti, to work with the team as an assistant coach.

On 8 September 2020 Bulleri was called by Pallacanestro Varese to replace Attilio Caja as head coach; he signed for the 2020–21 season with an option for the next year. Even though he managed to save the team from the relegation to the Serie A2, the option was not used and Buller left the Varese.

Honors and awards as a player

Pro clubs
FIBA Saporta Cup Champion: 1999
4× Italian Cup Winner: 2000, 2003, 2004, 2005 
2× Italian Supercup Winner: 2001, 2002
2× Italian League Champion: 2002, 2003 
3× Italian League All-Star: 2004, 2005, 2006
Italian League All-Star Game MVP: 2006

Italian national team
2001 Mediterranean Games: 
2003 EuroBasket: 
2004 Summer Olympic Games:

Individual
2× Italian League MVP: 2003, 2005
Italian Cup MVP: 2005
Officer of the Order of Merit of the Italian Republic - Rome, 27 September 2004. The initiative of the President of the Republic.

References

External links 
 Euroleague.net Profile
 FIBA Profile
 FIBA Europe Profile
 Italian League Profile 
 Eurobasket.com Profile

1977 births
Living people
Basketball players at the 2004 Summer Olympics
Basket Ferentino players
Competitors at the 2001 Mediterranean Games
Italian basketball coaches
Italian men's basketball players
Lega Basket Serie A players
Medalists at the 2004 Summer Olympics
Mediterranean Games bronze medalists for Italy
Mediterranean Games medalists in basketball
New Basket Brindisi players
Olimpia Milano players
Olympic basketball players of Italy
Olympic medalists in basketball
Olympic silver medalists for Italy
Pallacanestro Treviso players
Pallacanestro Varese players
People from Cecina, Tuscany
Point guards
Reyer Venezia players
Shooting guards
Sportspeople from the Province of Livorno
Virtus Bologna players